P. fulgida may refer to:

 Perna fulgida, a saltwater mussel
 Promenia fulgida, a marine bristle worm
 Psiloptera fulgida, a jewel beetle
 Pyreneola fulgida, a dove snail